"The Unparalleled Invasion" is a science fiction story written by American author Jack London. It was first published in McClure's in July 1910.

Plot summary
Under the influence of Japan, China modernizes and undergoes its own version of the Meiji Reforms in the 1910s. In 1922, China breaks away from Japan and fights a brief war that culminates in the Chinese annexation of the Japanese possessions of Korea, Formosa, and Manchuria. Enraged over the loss of Indochina to Chinese migrants and invading armies, France attempts to blockade China, but is thwarted by China's economic self-sufficiency. In a last-ditch attempt, France assembles a large military force to invade China, but the entire force is quickly defeated by China's vast army. Over the next half century, China's population steadily grows, and eventually migration overwhelms every other European colony in Asia.

By 1975, the population of China is double that of the Western world combined, and China's government is confident that the nation's high birth rate and population will result in Chinese world domination. The United States enlists the help of other Western powers and amasses an invasion force on China's borders. America then launches a biological warfare campaign against China, resulting in the total destruction of China's population, with the few survivors of the plague being killed out of hand by European and American troops. Some German soldiers are exposed to "a sort of hybridization between plague-germs" in China and are studied by German scientists, but the infection is safely kept from spreading. China is then colonized by the Western powers, opening the way to a joyous epoch of "splendid mechanical, intellectual, and art output". In the 1980s, war clouds once more gather between Germany and France over Alsace–Lorraine. The story ends with the nations of the world solemnly pledging not to use the same techniques that they had used against China.

Background and context 
"The Unparalleled Invasion" was included in The Strength of the Strong, a collection of stories by London published by Macmillan in 1914, which also included "The Dream of Debs", a critique of capitalist society in the US, and "The Strength of the Strong", which used a primitive background as metaphor of social injustice among men.

"The Unparalleled Invasion" has been used to support claims of racism in London's work. Academics pointed out that the premise, themes, and even some passages were borrowed directly from London's 1904 "Yellow Peril" essay, where London warns that "the menace to the Western World lies, not in the [Japanese] little brown man, but in the four hundred millions of [Chinese] yellow men".

However, other academics have also claimed that this story is a "strident warning against race hatred and its paranoia", due to its focus on the danger posed to China by the West. The story has also been viewed as a prescient political prediction of the rise of China as a world political power triggered in part by Japan's imperial aspirations.

See also
History of biological warfare
Yellow Peril

References

External links

 Full text of "The Unparalleled Invasion" online
"The Unparalleled Invasion," as published in McClure's Magazine (July 1910), featuring illustrations by Andre Castaigne.  Hosted by the Internet Archive.

Short stories by Jack London
Speculative fiction short stories
1910 short stories
China in fiction
Genocide in fiction
Ethnic cleansing
Works about racism
Biological warfare
Fiction set in 1922
Fiction set in 1970
Fiction set in 1975
Fiction set in 1976
Fiction set in 1987
Anti-Chinese sentiment in the United States
Future history